Sekolah Menengah Jenis Kebangsaan Kwang Hua is a Malaysian secondary school located in the centre of the Klang, Selangor.

SMJK Kwang Hua was established in 1955 originated as a sectarian private school Chinese. In line with the government policy, the school was converted to a government-aided school in 1962. The main difference of the school is that all students are required to learn Mandarin. They are also required to take Chinese subject in PT3 and SPM examinations. In other words, the school is concerned with three languages, Malay, English and Mandarin, in hope that all the students are able to master the languages when they completed their studies at Form Five. SMJK Kwang Hua is a grade A school that has a 3660 students, 151 teachers and 12 support personnel. The school had shown excellent results in academic performance where many students were awarded scholarship from the Public Service Department and more importantly in student character development. In recent years, many students gained admission to top universities around the world.

School motto 
Kejujuran '诚'(Honesty)

Ketekunan '勤'(Hardworking)

Jimat cermat '俭'(Frugality)

Keazaman '毅'(Dedication).

School compound 
The school has 6 buildings, a football field, 4 basketball courts in which; 2 indoor courts and 2 outdoor courts, and a volleyball court.
 Hall
 Canteen
 Dataran Kwang Hua (Kwang Hua Square)
 Activity Centre / Notice Boards (Demolished, currently in construction of a new multimedia building)
 Restroom
 Block A, B, C, D, E (classrooms)
 Teachers' Office
 Computer room
 Library
 Multimedia Building (Block E, 'ICT Block'), which accommodates laboratories and 3 classrooms.
 Office

References 

Secondary schools in Malaysia
Chinese-language schools in Malaysia
Schools in Selangor
Publicly funded schools in Malaysia